The Center for Applied Genomics is a research center at the Children's Hospital of Philadelphia that focuses on genomics research and the utilization of basic research findings in the development of new medical treatments.

As one of the world's largest genetics research and analytical facilities, the Center for Applied Genomics has processed genetic samples from over 100,000 people due to its access to high-throughput genotyping technology.

The center is focused on detecting the genetic causes of prevalent childhood diseases including (but not limited to) asthma, obesity, ADHD, autism, diabetes, inflammatory bowel disease, epilepsy, schizophrenia, and pediatric cancer, all of which are thought to involve multiple, interacting genes within the body.

Projects

ADHD
Although highly heritable, genetic correlates of attention deficit hyperactivity disorder (ADHD) have been difficult to pinpoint. In 2009, Center for Applied Genomics researchers identified copy number variants as a potential cause of the disorder. CNVs are relatively large segments of chromosomes where the DNA has been deleted, duplicated, or rearranged. The group found 222 CNVs that were more common in individuals with ADHD than in unrelated healthy individuals. These CNVs tended to concentrate in areas that had previously been associated with other neuro-developmental disorders including autism, schizophrenia and Tourette syndrome. They also tended to occur at or near genes known to be important for learning, synapse transmission, and nervous system development. This paper was one of the first to pinpoint CNVs as a genetic cause of ADHD and was important in identifying previously unassociated genes.

Asthma
Asthma is a complex disease with genetic and environmental causes. It affects more than 6% of children in the developed world (Fanta, 2009). Because of its complexity, candidate genes for asthma have been difficult to determine. In 2010, the center published a genome-wide association study of 3,377 children with asthma and 5,579 healthy children. This type of study allows researchers to examine genetic variations across an individual's entire genome and compare variations between affected and unaffected groups. Researchers discovered a region on chromosome 17 and a previously unassociated region on chromosome 1 that strongly correlated with susceptibility to asthma. The region in chromosome 1 was especially associated with asthma in the children of African ancestry, and contains a gene, DENND1B, that is expressed by natural killer cells – a critical component of the immune system. Targeting the DENND1B gene may be a promising avenue for future treatments of asthma.

Autism
Although twin studies suggest that ASDs are highly heritable, specific genes have been difficult to identify. In 2009, the Center conducted a genome-wide association study on a group of 780 families (3,101 individuals) with affected children, a second group of 1,204 affected individuals, and 6,491 controls, all of whom had European ancestry. By comparing genomics variations between the groups, researchers led by Kai Wang identified six genetic markers between two specific genes that confirmed susceptibility to ASDs. This was the first study to demonstrate a genome-wide significant association of this kind. The two genes, cadherin 10 and cadherin 9 are sticky molecules that help neurons bind together. They play an important role in neurodevelopment, and may be important in helping us understand the neuropathology of autism.

In 2009, the Center published a second paper in the journal Nature that identified copy number variations (CNVs) as important genetic features in autism. Led by Joseph Glessner, the group examined 859 autism cases and 1,409 healthy children of European ancestry. The autism group had significantly more CNVs on or near genes that had previously been associated with the disorder. Further, they identified several new susceptibility genes in ubiquitin networks that were associated with the autism group. Ubiquitins are small proteins that help to destroy unneeded or damaged proteins. Damage to ubiquitin networks can theoretically cause neurological changes that may underlie autism and are an important avenue for future research into the disorder.

Cancer
Neuroblastoma is a type of cancer most commonly found in children that affects the sympathetic nervous system (part of the nervous system that helps control our organs). It is often lethal. In 2008, the Center group collaborated with the Maris Lab at the Children's Hospital of Pennsylvania to publish the first of three important papers on the genetic causes of neuroblastoma. They performed a genome-wide association study comparing the genomes of 1032 patients and 2043 controls. The researchers found a significant association between neuroblastoma and a region of chromosome 6.

In 2009, the Center followed-up this finding with another genome-wide association study that focused on a 397-person high-risk subset of the neuroblastoma group. They identified a region on chromosome 2 on or near the BARD1 gene, which has been found to regulate cell growth and tumor suppressants. These data show that a common variation in the BARD1 gene contributes to aggressive neuroblastoma – the most clinically important form of the disease.

In 2009, the Center contributed another study identifying copy number variations (CNVs) as a potential cause of neuroblastoma. CNVs are segments of DNA consisting of deleted, duplicated, or rearranged genetic material. They identified a CNV on chromosome 1 that associated with the disorder. It behaved similarly to a class of genes known as neuroblastoma breakpoint family (NBPF) genes and was thus implicated as a previously unknown member of the neuroblastoma breakpoint family gene. The study was the first germline CNV study in any cancer.

Testicular cancer is the most common form of cancer in men between the ages of 15 and 34, but also peaks in infancy and old age. In 2009, in collaboration with the Nathanson Lab at the University of Pennsylvania, the Center published the results of a genome-wide associated study that examined the genomes of 227 patients with testicular germ cell tumors and 919 controls. They identified an area on chromosome 5 as a major risk factor for the disease, which was in the region of a gene called SPRY4. A specific copy of this gene is associated with a 40% greater chance of testicular cancer. Even more strikingly, they identified a region in chromosome 12 within a gene called KITLG. Patients with a specific form of the KITLG gene were much more likely to have testicular cancer – each copy of the gene-form increased risk of testicular cancer threefold. This represents one of the largest effect sizes reported in cancer.

Crohn's Disease
Crohn's disease (CD) is one of the two main forms of inflammatory bowel disease (the other being ulcerative colitis). It affects the gastrointestinal tract, and may cause pain, diarrhea, and vomiting, and can result in significant weight loss. The genetic associations of CD have remained elusive. In 2008, the Center pioneered an alternative strategy for examining the disorder by focusing on age-of-onset. To this end, they carried out a genome-wide association study of 1,011 individuals with pediatric-onset IBD and 4,250 matched controls. Researchers identified and replicated two previously unreported regions on chromosome 20 and chromosome 21 that predicted childhood IBD. These regions were located near the genes TNFRSF6B and PSMG1 respectively. The first of these genes is now thought to be intimately linked to the biology of IBD.

In a subsequent paper, the Center applied pathway analysis to focus on multiple regions in the genome that may interact to cause Crohn's disease.  Researchers led by Kai Wang identified an association between CD and a network of 20 genes. The network contains many interleukins – proteins that are critical components of the immune system. Many of the genes in the pathway did not correlate significantly with CD independently. However, when analyzed together, the network of genes did significantly associate with the disorder. This finding represents an important proof-of-principle as the first demonstration of the power of a pathway approach to understanding human genomics.

In 2009, the center also published a genome-wide association study of inflammatory bowel diseases (Crohn's disease and ulcerative colitis) in 3,426 affected individuals and 11,963 genetically matched controls. Researchers identified five new regions associated with early-onset IBD, and detected associations at a number of loci previously implicated in adult-onset IBD. This provides an important demonstration of the close genetic relationship between early- and adult-onset IBD.

Schizophrenia
Schizophrenia is a complex disorder that affects about a half percent of the world's population. Typically, the first symptoms of schizophrenia typically appear in adolescence. In a genome-wide association study of 1,735 schizophrenic patients and 3,485 healthy adults, the Center identified copy number variations as a potential cause of the disorder. In the schizophrenia group, researchers located CNVs near the CACNA1B and DOC2A genes, both of which facilitate calcium signals that are important to neurotransmission in the brain. They also identified CNVs near the RET and RIT2 genes, which are known to be involved in brain development. Some of the regions associated with schizophrenia have previously been found to associate with autism and ADHD. This provides a strong indication that many psychiatric disorders stem share similar neurodevelopmental features.

Type 1 Diabetes
Type 1 diabetes in children results from autoimmune destruction of cells in the pancreas, leading to an insufficient production of insulin. It is fatal unless treated by insulin. In 2007, researchers performed a genome-wide association study in a large pediatric group that identified a previously unknown association between type 1 diabetes and a genetic variation on chromosome 16. This region contains KIAA0350, the gene product of which is predicted to be a sugar-binding protein. Subsequent follow-up studies (e.g. Concannon et al., 2008) have confirmed a link between this gene and type-1 diabetes, and our group is currently participating in a resequencing study of this region.

Technology 
The center uses microarrays to perform whole-genome analysis – microarrays are slides consisting of thousands to millions of tiny probes. They allow researchers to screen an individual's genome for huge numbers of genetic markers called single nucleotide polymorphisms (SNPs). A SNP occurs when the DNA in two individuals in the population differs by a single nucleotide.  For example, one individual may have an 'A' at a specific position, and another individual may have a 'C'. This can impact on the protein encoded by the DNA sequence (the gene) and increase gene risk.

An association typically means that a SNP is significantly more frequent in a patient-group than in controls.  Once researchers know the location of a SNP that is more common in a group, they can examine the sequence of DNA from which it comes. In this way, they can check if it is part of a gene, or is close to a gene. The center can simultaneously scan the genome for thousands of these associations at once – a powerful methodology called genome-wide association. At the center, researchers have examined over 100,000 individuals.

Humans can also differ in the number of copies of each gene an individual has. These differences are called copy number variants. Rare alterations in a chromosome can lead to the gain or a loss of a copy.  A duplication occurs when a fragment of DNA is gained – during copying, or when genes are shuffled at conception. The same process can cause a deletion, where a fragment of DNA is lost. Deletions and duplications of greater than 1,000 nucleotides are called copy number variants (CNVs).

The center is equipped with the Illumina BeadArray System and utilizes both the Infinium and GoldenGate analytical methods. The center's equipment includes multiple Tecan hardware systems and scanning instruments with integrative Laboratory Information Management System (LIMS). It uses several genotyping units from Affymetrix, adding flexibility to internal and collaborative projects to conduct studies on either platform.

See also
 Penn Genome Frontiers Institute

References

External links 
 The Center for Applied Genomics homepage
 The Children's Hospital of Philadelphia

Bioinformatics organizations
Genetics or genomics research institutions
Medical research institutes in Pennsylvania
Organizations based in Philadelphia
Population genetics organizations